Wayne Gordon may refer to:

Wayne Gordon (boxer) (born 1963), Canadian boxer at the 1984 Summer Olympics
Wayne Gordon (footballer) (1954–1983), Australian rules footballer in the VFL
Wayne Gordon (actor), New Zealand-born actor in film and television